Lamberto Maggiorani (28 August 1909 – 22 April 1983) was an Italian actor remembered for his portrayal of Antonio Ricci in the 1948 Vittorio De Sica film Bicycle Thieves.

He was a factory worker (he worked as a turner) and a non-professional actor at the time he was cast in this film. He earned 600,000 lire ($1,000 US) for his performance, enabling him to buy new furniture and treat his family to a vacation; but when he returned to the factory he was laid off because business was slackening and management felt it would be fairer to terminate him instead of other impoverished co-workers since he was perceived to have "made millions" as a movie star. He found occasional work as a bricklayer, but continued to try to get roles in movies, with little success; even de Sica was reluctant to employ him as anything other than an extra. Pier Paolo Pasolini gave him a bit part in the film Mamma Roma (1962) due to his iconic status in Italian cinema. Cesare Zavattini, the screenwriter for Bicycle Thieves, aware of Maggiorani's predicament, wrote a screenplay about him titled "Tu, Maggiorani", in an attempt to demonstrate the limits of neorealist film's capacity to change the world.

Maggiorani died in Rome in 1983 at the San Giovanni hospital without ever regaining his first success as a film actor.

Filmography

References

External links 
 .

1909 births
1983 deaths
Italian male film actors
20th-century Italian male actors
Male actors from Rome
People of Lazian descent